Nigerian cuisine consists of dishes or food items from the hundreds of ethnic groups that comprise Nigeria. Like other West African cuisines, it uses spices and herbs with palm or groundnut oil to create deeply flavored sauces and soups.

Nigerian feasts can be colourful and lavish, while aromatic market and roadside snacks cooked on barbecues or fried in oil are in abundance and varied. Bushmeat is also consumed in Nigeria. The brush-tailed porcupine and cane rats are the most popular bushmeat species in Nigeria.

Tropical fruits such as pineapple, coconut, banana, and mango are mostly consumed in Nigeria.

Nigerian cuisine, like many West African cuisines, is known for being spicy.

Entrees

Rice-based
Coconut rice is rice made with coconut milk, tomato puree and other spices.
Jollof rice is a rice dish made with pureed tomato and Scotch bonnet-based sauce.
Ofada rice is a popular Nigerian rice variety. It is also called unpolished rice as it is rice in its natural state.
Fried rice is typically mixed with an assortment of eggs, vegetables, meat, poultry or prawns.
Pate is made with ground dry corn, rice or acha. Mostly combined with vegetables (spinach), tomatoes, onions, peppers, garden eggs (eggplants), locust beans, groundnuts, biscuit bones and minced meat are common in northwestern Nigeria, like Kano, Kaduna, Nassarawa and Plateau.
Tuwo masara is a corn-flour dish eaten in Northern Nigeria.
Tuwo shinkafa, thick rice pudding usually eaten with miyan kuka (a thick soup) and goat meat stew or miyan taushe, a pumpkin stew made with spinach, meat (usually goat or mutton) and smoked fish. It is primarily served in the northern part of the country.
White rice—foreign white rice and local rice is served with local pepper stews and sauces from different tribes. It is widely served with a thick tomato and pepper-based stew.
Banga rice is a traditional Nigerian rice recipe made from palm nut and rice. It is very common in the southern (Delta State) and eastern parts of the country.
Palm-oil rice is often referred to as 'local rice'; usually prepared with fresh palm oil, assorted fish (dried fish and smoked fish), garnished with local spices like locust beans ('okpeyi' or 'dawa dawa'), onions and pepper. It could be made as jollof or as white rice with the palm oil stew separate.
Curried rice is rice made with fresh turmeric or curry powder, onions, salt and Maggi seasoning to taste and then vegetable sauce is made to go along with it.  
Masa is made from 'tuwon shinkafa' rice that is blended after being destoned (onions and other spices are put in it). Then, yeast is added and it is allowed to rise. it is later cooked with low heat in a custom-made masa pot.
Danbu rice is also a type of rice usually made in the North. It used to be ground and mixed with pepper.

Bean-based
Akara, a type of fritter made from beans
Gbegiri, a bean-based stew from Southwestern Nigeria
Abula soup
Moi moi, a steamed bean pudding made from a mixture of washed and peeled black-eyed beans, onions and fresh ground red peppers
Ekuru, a steamed savoury bean dish from the Western states of Nigeria
Ewa aganyin, boiled beans eaten with a pepper sauce
Kiyaru Batonu in Kwara State
Okpa, a common breakfast food made from Bambara nut flour in Southeastern Nigeria
Adalu, a bean and sweet corn pottage

Corn-based

• Egbo , a Yoruba delicacy that can be eaten alone with pepper sauce or paired with beans making it even more delicious .

Meat

Meat is used in most Nigerian dishes.

Suya, from the north of Nigeria, is grilled meat coated with ground chili pepper, peanut powder, and other local spices. It is prepared barbecue-style on a stick. This is one of the most famous Nigerian delicacies and can be found within easy reach all over the country.
Tsire refers specifically to meat which has a generous coating of peanut/chili powder. The meat may or may not be on a skewer.
Kilishi is  similar to beef jerk thin it  is made from meat that has been cut into very thin slices, which are then spread out to dry. A preparation of chili pepper, spices and local herbs is then prepared into a paste which is lightly brushed on both sides. This is then briefly grilled.
Balangu refers to meat that has been grilled over wood/coal fire. Specifically, no seasoning is applied to bring out the natural flavour of the particular type of meat which may be Goat, mutton or beef. Salt and spices can be added later according to taste. Most of these meaty delicacies are Hausa/Fulani.
Nkwobi consists of cooked cow legs smothered in a thick, spicy palm oil sauce, a classic dish originating from the southeast of Nigeria.
Asun is spicy roasted goat chopped into bite-sized pieces, with bold aromatic flavors from onions, habanero, Garlic and bell peppers. Native to the Yoruba speaking Ondo people in Western Nigeria.
Salted dried ram meat is called Eran Oniyo in Yoruba language. Rice Risotto with Salted Sun-Dried Ram Meat is a dish common to Muslims in Lagos State. It is usually prepared with ram meat used for the Eid-el Kabir festival. Prime cuts from the ram meat like the thigh, ribs and some fatty parts are washed in lime water to drain out blood, the meat is covered in salt and sun-dried for a few days.

Soups and stews
 Banga soup is made from palm nuts and is eaten primarily in the south and mid-western parts of Nigeria.
 Ofe akwu is also made from palm nuts, but prepared more like a stew meant to be eaten with rice.
 Miyan kuka, very common among the Hausa people, is made from powdered baobab leaves and dried okra.
 Miyan yakuwa is a famous Hausa soup.
 Ewedu soup, popular amongst the Yoruba people of south-western Nigeria, is jute leaves cooked by pureeing the leaves with a blender or special broom.
 Eka soup (beniseed soup) is a popular dish among the Idomas of Benue State, the Ogojas in Cross River and the Ibirams of Kogi State. Eka is a blend of sesame seeds, roasted groundnut and palm kernel puree.
Margi special is common in the northeastern part of Nigeria, Borno, Adamawa and Yobe states. The soup comes from the Margi people who live in riverine areas. It is prepared with fresh fish of any kind and African soreal (yakuwa in Hausa or omblanji in Margi).
 Edikang-ikong is a vegetable soup made from ugwu (pumpkin) leaves and waterleaf which originated with the Annang, Ibibio and Efik people.
 Gbegiri is a bean-based stew from southwest Nigeria.
 Orunla is a soup made from dried okra, roughly chopped and sun-dried. It is common among the Yorubas.
 Pepper soup is a light soup made from a mix of meat and fish with herbs and spices. This is one of the few soups in Nigerian cuisine that can be eaten alone and is not used as a sauce for a carbohydrate main dish such as fufu or pounded yam. It can also be made with nutmeg and chili peppers. It can be garnished with fish, beef, goat meat or chicken. Peppersoup is often an appetizer at official gatherings; however, it is consumed also in the evening at pubs and social gatherings.
It is prepared with waterleaf and ukazi or afaang with kpomo, perinwinkles and lots of assorted meat and fish.
 Corn soup, also known locally as omi ukpoka, is made with ground dry corn and blended with smoked fish. It is a common food of the Afemai, especially people from Agenebode in northern Edo state.
 Draw soup (or okoroenyeribe) is made from okra or ogbono seeds cooked until they thicken.
 Atama soup, a palm kernel soup
 Efo riro/Efo elegusi, a stew made from leafy vegetables, pepper, palm oil and other ingredients, is common among the Yorubas.
 Egusi soup is thickened with ground melon seeds and contains leafy and other vegetables, seasonings, and meat. It is often eaten with dishes like amala, pounded yam (iyan), fufu, etc.
 Miyan taushe, a great blend of groundnut and pumpkin leaves spiced with pepper, dawadawa or iru, & seasoning cubes. It is enjoyed best with tuwo shinkafa.
  
 Maafe, a stew made with groundnuts (peanuts), tomatoes and onions as the base, can be infinitely varied with chicken, beef or fish and different leafy vegetables for subtle flavours. Groundnut stew is made with ground dry groundnuts and vegetables, fish, meat, local seasoning and palm oil by the Etsakor people in Edo state.
 Buka stew, similar to maafe, is a stew made from goat, beef or chicken and cooked with tomatoes, onions, pepper.
 Ogbono soup is made with ground ogbono seeds, with leafy greens, other vegetables, seasonings, and meat. Ogbono is also eaten with many dishes similar to pounded yam, amala, fufu, etc.
 White soup, also called ofe nsala, made with utazi leaves. 
 Bitterleaf soup (ofe onugbu) is made with cocoyam that was cooked and pounded, palm oil (or 'akwu')  ogiri, assorted fish and meat (as you desire), pepper, maggi and salt. Then fresh bitterleaf that has been plucked and dried briefly is mashed with hands until the bitter taste is off put and made to boil until the taste blends.
 Ofada stew (Ayamase) is a palm-oil-based stew popular in western Nigeria. It's made with palm oil, unripe pepper and tomatoes, beef, tripe, cow skin and locust beans. It's a stew for local ofada rice, also referred to as brown rice. It's usually served in 'ewe' (flat, broad leaves). To make the stew, palm oil is first bleached until it is thin and then used to cook locust beans. A blend of mixed peppers and tomatoes are added, then the beef, and it's cooked for 10–15 minutes.
 Groundnut soup (Peanut soup) is made from fresh peanut ground to paste, (though some may fry the peanut too), onions, bell pepper can be added while grinding it. Then it is stirred in palm oil with onions until it fries. The meat stock is then added and once it boils, you add crayfish and other fish and/or meat and allow to boil together, after which leaves are added (pumpkin leaf, bitterleaf or any other). 
 Ora (Oha) soup is made with cocoyam that used to be cooked and pounded, palm oil (or 'akwu')  ogiri, assorted fish and meat (as you desire), pepper, maggi and salt.
 Edo esan (black soup)
 Ofe owerri is prepared with four kinds vegetable leaves; okazi, ugu,uziza and oha leaves. A particular species of coco yam is used as a thickener to make the soup thick. This vegetable soup is common among the igbos of eastern Nigeria. 'ofe' means soup in igbo language and 'Owerri' is the capital city of Imo state in eastern Nigeria.
 Achara soup, mostly found in Abia State- Ndiwo, Ngwa, Umuahia, Itumbauzo.
Snake, squirrel, rabbit and wild dog dishes are used by some Nigerians to prepare soups and stews.

Side dishes

Dodo is a side dish of plantains fried in vegetable or palm oil, preferably ripe plantain.
Gizdodo is a combination of fried Dodo and grilled gizzard.
Funkaso, millet pancakes.
Mosa, fermented corn ground into a thick paste, fried then sprinkled with sugar. It is an acquired taste. An alternative form made from very soft plantain, is mashed into a paste, mixed with dried black pepper, fried then sprinkled with sugar.
salad, vegetable salad made of cabbage,carrot

Puddings, pastes and porridges
Moin moin is a savoury steamed bean pudding made from a mixture of peeled black-eyed peas and wrapped in a leaf (like a banana leaf).
Plantain pudding commonly known as okpo ogede.
Corn pudding locally known as okpo oka.
Rice pudding made from blended 'tuwon rice' and poured into boiling water. It should be stirred continuously on a moderate fire until it is ready.
Pap or 'akamu' or 'ogi' made from guinea corn, millet or corn.
Tapioca pudding is made from cassava extract, it is similar to pap due to its physical appearance and the way it is prepared.

Yam-based

Iyan, called pounded yam in English, is similar to mashed potatoes but all mashed and completely smooth with no yam chunks left.
Amala (or aririguzofranca) is a thick paste made from yam, which has been peeled, cleaned, dried and then blended similar to iyan but normally darker (brown) in colour.
Yam porridge is a local home-made meal popular in the eastern and southern parts of Nigeria. Asaro is a version common in the western region. Method of preparation differs based on taste, preference and affordability. It is made by boiling and lightly mashing yam in rich tomato, chili and big red pepper sauce with palm oil or vegetable oil. It can be garnished with fish, meat or crayfish as desired.
Ebiripo is most common amongst the Remo people in South-West Nigeria. It is made by grating coco-yam to a paste, salt and groundnut oil is then added to taste and filled in leaves made into scoops before boiling, and usually eaten with soups like efo riro or efo elegusi.
Ikokore, also known as ifokore, is a popular dish in the Ijebu areas of South-West Nigeria. It is similar to asaro in preparation but water yam (Dioscorea alata) is used instead of yam. The water yam (called isu ewura in Yoruba language) is grated and some bits left in ungrated and cooked with a mixture of pepper, palm oil, fish and condiments.

Cassava-based
Eba, also called garri, is a very thick paste that is either rolled into balls or served like amala, and made from cassava (manioc).
Fufu, a staple dish in Nigeria and most of West Africa.
Lafun is basically like amala but much lighter in colour, and made from cassava. It is not to be confused with iyan; it tastes and smells totally different from the yam-based iyan.

Breakfast

 originated from the north and is eaten both as lunch and breakfast. Rice is soaked and then ground. Yogurt is added, forming a thick paste, and left to ferment, or yeast and sugar is added to taste. Poured into clay forms and heated from below, a spatula is used to flip over and gouge the masa out of the form. It is traditionally served with miyan taushe (pumpkin stew) or honey.
Sinasir is a flat masa, made by simply pouring the prepared rice paste into a frying pan, thus avoiding the need to flip it over as would be necessary with masa. This is a predominantly Hausa food.
Alkubus is Hausa-Fulani steamed bread made from wheat, flour, yeast and water, put in moulds and steamed. It is served with miyan taushe.
Yams with red stew or scrambled eggs with diced tomato and onion.
Agidi, also known as Eko, is a popular breakfast meal in Nigeria. It is served in combination with other foods such as Akara (fried bean cake), beans, pepper soup, and other soups.
Ogi or Akamu is corn pudding common in Nigeria, called ogi by the Yoruba and akamu by the Igbo.
Egbo is a food made from corn

Snacks
Chin chin are best described as fried diced cookies made from flour, eggs and butter.
Puff-puff, fried sweet dough balls.
Buns, another fried sweet dough ball snack. However, it does not include yeast.
Akara is a beignet from a batter based on black-eyed peas. It is sometimes served for breakfast.
Alkaki (doughnuts) made from wheat and sugar paste.
Kuli-kuli, made from ground peanuts.
Kokoro is a fried dry snack made from corn and garri (cassava). There are two different kinds.
Meat pie, beef and vegetables enclosed in a pastry case. 
Wara, soft cottage cheese made from fresh cow milk.
Awara or beske is the local name for tofu amongst Yoruba-speaking people.
Plantain chips are a crunchy, salty or sweet Nigerian snack made with either ripe or unripe plantains fried in vegetable oil.
Coconut candy
Aadun is made from cornflour, chilli pepper and palm oil
Dundu, roasted or deep-fried slices of yam. It may be fried in palm oil or vegetable oil; water is added to soften the yam as it cooks. Dundu is usually eaten with a sauce made of groundnut or palm oil, tomatoes, chili peppers and seasoning.
Ojojo is a beignet made from grated/ground water yam (Dioscorea alata). Peppers, onions and seasoning are mixed with the grated water yam before being deep-fried. Water yam is known as isu ewura in South West Nigeria.

Beverages

Kunu is a very popular drink made of either millet, sorghum or maize.
Fura is a popular drink, especially across northern Nigeria, made of cooked then pounded millet or sorghum with a little cow's milk.
Palm wine, which may be distilled into ogogoro.
Zobo (hibiscus leaf) is a drink made of roselle juice (the Yorubas call the white variety isapa).
Soya bean milk is a drink made from soaked, ground, and sieved soya bean.

See also

 West African cuisine
 List of African cuisines

References

External links
Food in Nigeria

 
West African cuisine